Bauhinia galpinii is a species of shrub in the family Fabaceae. It is endemic to parts of eastern and southern Africa, where its popular name is "pride of De Kaap". In other places however, it is variously known as orchid tree, red bauhinia, nasturtium bauhinia, African Plume, red orchid bush, and by other informal names. The species name commemorates E. E. Galpin, a South African botanist and banker. Its common names include South African orchid bush, red bauhinia and Nasturtium bush.

Description
The leaves are bilobed, each having a symmetrical pair of rounded lobes joined symmetrically about a midrib, with a small, soft mucronule in the notch at the tip. The resulting shape gave rise to the Afrikaans popular name "kameelpoot", meaning "camel's foot". The mucronule is fragile and frequently is missing as a result of minor damage. The flowers in the wild generally are a handsome brick red, but some cultivars have pink or orange-red flowers.

Habit
The plant is evergreen, with its main growing season in summer.

Ecology and uses
Its flowers are of value to pollinators, including birds, and the sheltering shrubby habit renders it popular as a nesting site for small birds. Sheep and goats can safely browse the leaves and twigs.

Cultivation
The species is widely cultivated as a fairly drought-hardy, non-xerophytic ornamental in the warm zones of the United States and Mexico where it has escaped cultivation and naturalised in some locations, but without any significant tendency towards invasiveness.

References

External links
 PlantZAfrica.com
 iSpot images
 

galpinii
Flora of South Africa
Garden plants of Southern Africa
Taxa named by N. E. Brown